Brigade Commander is a 1991 video game published by TTR Development.

Gameplay
Brigade Commander is a real time tactical wargame in which the modern units are platoons represented on a hex map.

Reception
Leah Wesolowski reviewed the game for Computer Gaming World, and stated that "With much of the work taken out of wargaming, along with its real-time movement and its built-in editor, this game is truly a die-hard wargamer's dream. It is, in this reviewer's opinion, destined to become a classic for Amiga computer wargamers."

Tom Malcom for Info gave the game three stars and said "Wargamers will probably find Brigade Commander interesting, but they're the only ones who will."

Reviews
Amiga Action - Aug, 1991
Amiga Power - Aug, 1991
ASM (Aktueller Software Markt) - Nov, 1991

References

1991 video games
Amiga games
Amiga-only games
Computer wargames
Europe-exclusive video games
Real-time strategy video games
Video games developed in the United Kingdom